Nebraska Highway 19 is a highway in Nebraska.  It has a southern terminus at the Colorado border south of Sidney and a northern terminus west of Sidney at an intersection with U.S. Highway 30.

Route description
Nebraska Highway 19 begins at the Colorado border at a point which is also the north terminus of Colorado State Highway 113.  It goes northeasterly through Lorenzo.  It continues this way, then goes due north shortly before meeting Interstate 80 at Exit 55 of that interstate highway.  It continues due north and ends at U.S. Highway 30 west of Sidney.

History
Nebraska Highway 19 was a highway which spanned the width of the Nebraska Panhandle.  It followed the original route of U.S. Highway 385, going north to the South Dakota border.  In 1958, US 385 was designated over the former route of Nebraska Highway 19 north of Sidney.  Today, the former route follows US 385 except for the section north of Alliance, which follows Nebraska Highway 2 in Alliance, Nebraska Highway 87 north out of Alliance, and Nebraska Link 7E west from N-87 to the current US 385.

Major intersections

See also

 List of state highways in Nebraska

References

External links

 The Nebraska Highways Page: Highways 1 to 30
 Business Loop 80

019
Transportation in Cheyenne County, Nebraska